Green Peter Dam is a concrete gravity dam impounding the Middle Santiam River in Linn County in the U.S. state of Oregon.  It was completed in 1967 to generate hydroelectricity, prevent flood damage, provide irrigation, and improve water quality downstream.  Water released by the dam is regulated by the Foster Dam  down the river.

Green Peter Reservoir, created by the dam, is a popular area for fishing, boating, and other water sports.

The dam is featured in the 2013 film Night Moves.

See also 
 List of lakes in Oregon

References 

Dams in Oregon
Buildings and structures in Linn County, Oregon
United States Army Corps of Engineers dams
Dams completed in 1967
1967 establishments in Oregon
Gravity dams